Ak Ilbirs, National Film Awards in the Kyrgyz Republic, was established to recognize the best achievements in the cinema in the country and to stimulate the artistic growth of national cinema in all areas of filmmaking.

Film Award winners in each category are awarded statuettes of a snow leopard  (ak Ilibris) a symbol of agility, luck and creative flight, sculpted by Sadyrbek Makeev.

The first film award ceremony of "Ak Ilbirs" was held on 27 October 2012.

History 

"Ak Ilbirs Awards"  is held annually and takes place in the Kyrgyz Republic, awarding each year's winners in different categories.
The main purpose of Ak Ilbirs Awards is to improve the quality of cinema, produced by national film production, as well as to provide an incentive for further development by selecting the best works in each category, approved by authority committee.

Founders of the "Ak Ilbirs" National Film Awards 

 Artykpay Suyundukov
 Aktan Arym Kubat
 Marat Sarulu
 Sadyk Sher-Niyaz
 Taalaibek Kulmendeev
 Temir Birnazarov
 Nurlan Abdykadyrov
 Ernest Abdyjaparov

Management of the National Film Awards Ceremony 

 Directorate of the Ceremony consists of a Manager, Art director, Accountant and Administrator.
 The Manager is accountable to the Directorate of the Founders of the National Film Awards and is responsible for conducting the National Film Ceremony.
 Art director is accountable to the founders of the National Film Awards and is responsible for the selection of films nominated for the National Film Award.
 Accountant reports to the Manager and is responsible for the financial activities of the National Film Awards ceremony.
 The Administrator reports to the Manager and is responsible for conducting the ceremony of the National Film Awards.
 The Manager has the right, according to estimates, to hire, as necessary,  a technical and creative professionals for the award period of the ceremony.

Sources of Award Ceremony funding 

 Organization of the Ak Ilbirs Awards Ceremony are financed by personal contributions of the founder and partner support of individuals and entities, public and private initiatives, as well as International organization.
 For the purposes of accounting and control of financial contributions and the optimal allocation of funds, the Organization Ceremony Founders established the General Executive Directorate of National Film Awards Ceremony.
 The budget of the ceremony is set and approved by the founders of the National Film Awards on the basis of their confirmation on the schedule of the ceremony.

Ak Ilbirs statuette 

The Scythian snow leopard, made of gold and bronze in the first half of the 5th century. BC, was the inspiration for the statuette. It is made of bronze and black marble monolith, weighing 2.0 kg. The name of the National Film Award is carved on it in ancient Kyrgyz alphabet.

Nominations 

 Best Film
 Best Short Film
 Best Documentary
 Best Screenplay
 Best Director
 Best Cinematography
 Best Artist
 Best Composer
 Best Sound
 Best Actor
 Best Actress
 Best Producer
 Audience Award
 Best Film of Central Asia
 Best Actor of Central Asia
 Best Actress of Central Asia
 Outstanding Contribution to National Cinema
 Outstanding Contribution to World Cinema

Basic rules and criteria for the selection of nominees 

 Any film of any genre, produced in the previous year, can be nominated for Ak Ilbirs National Film Awards.
 Anyone has right to apply for the Ak Ilbirs National Film Awards with films of any genre, produced in the previous year.
 Management of the ceremony registers each claimed film and organizes a screening for the members of the Kyrgyz Republic National Film Academy for rating.
 After viewing a film, Members of the Academy record their assessments according to a 10-point system on the Nominations column form  (Best Picture, Best Cinematography, etc.) and sign. Upon request Members of the Academy can apply to sign their forms individually on a separate sheet. The Administration shall satisfy such a request only for valid reasons. Members of the Academy are deprived of the right to participate in the films' ratings if they are the director of the nominated movie . Members of the Academy have the right to submit three names in the "Outstanding Contribution to National Cinema" category. Evaluation forms are put into a sealed ballot box.
 The Ballot box containing the evaluation forms is opened on the day of delivery in the presence of the Founders of the National Film Awards and 2-3 representatives of the National Academy Awards. The calculated results are recorded, sealed in envelopes and announced only at the Awards Ceremony.

Date, place and format of the ceremony 

 The deadline for nominations expires annually on 10 February.
 The evaluation forms shall be filled and signed no later than 15 March of the ceremony year.
 The ceremony takes place on 14 April at Manas Cinema Theater.

Interesting facts 

 Along with the National Film Awards Ak Ilbirs, a special award "Outstanding Contribution to National Cinema" and "Outstanding Contribution to World Cinema" was established.
 In order to promote Kyrgyz cinema, the founders of Ak Ilbirs National Prize announced a national "Perspective" competition for the best articles in the media about the Kyrgyz cinema.
Any article about Kyrgyz cinematography, film, or portraits of filmmakers published in the national media can participate in a competition.
The prize fund of 200 thousand soms was established by the General Partner of the "Perspective" contest, Aitysh Public Fund, and is distributed as follows:

 "Grand Prix" – 75,000 Soms.
 "The Best Analytical Article on Kyrgyz Cinema" – 55,000 Soms
 "The Best Analysis of the Kyrgyz Film" – 35,000 Soms

Organization of Jury – 35,000 Soms

The contenders may send electronic versions of their articles with the title "Perspective" - Ak Ilbirs and a link to the published article. If it is printed, then provide the edition, where this article was published.
Articles published from 1 January to 30 April can participate in the competition.
The Award Ceremony of "Perspective" competition is held the day before Ak Ilbirs National Film Award Ceremony, in the first half of the May.
The Jury and assessment criteria are determined by the founders of the "Ak Ilbirs" National Film Awards
"Perspective"contestants cannot be members of the Jury.

Original records 

 Nomadic  - 6 awards in 2012 (Best Film, Best Director, Best Screenplay, Best Cinematography, Best Sound, Best Editing)
 The Princess Nasik - 6 awards in 2013 (Best Film, Best Director, Best Screenplay, Best Cinematography, Best Artist, Best Actress)
 Salaam New York  - 7 awards in 2014 (Best Film, Best Director, Best Screenplay, Best Editing, Best Artist, Best Composer, Audience Award)
 Kurmanjan Datka - 10 awards in 2015 (Best Film, Best Screenplay, Best Director, Best Cinematography, Best Editing, Best Actress, Best Actor, Best Composer, Best Sound, Audience Award)
 Heavenly Nomadic - 10 awards in 2016 (Best Film, Best Screenplay, Best Director, Best Cinematography, Best Artist, Best Editing, Best Actress, Best Actor, Best Composer, Best Sound)
 A Father's Will - 7 awards in 2017 (Best Film, Best Screenplay, Best Director, Best Cinematography, Best Artist, Best Editing, Best Actor)

Winners

2012 
 Best Picture: Nomadic, Dir.: Moldoseyit Mambetakunov and Artykpay Suyundukov
 Best Director: Dir. Moldoseyit Mambetakunov and Artykpay Suyundukov Nomadic
 Best Screenplay: Nomadic Moldoseyit Mambetakunov
 Best Cinematography: Stambulbek Mambetaliyev for Nomadic
 Best Artist: Eldiyar Madakim for How to Marry a Gu Jun Pyo?
 Best Composer: Nargiza Jalilova for How to Marry a Gu Jun Pyo?
 Best Sound: Marat Ergeshov for Nomadic
 Best Editing: Marat Ergeshov for Nomadic
 Best Actress: Zarema Asanalieva for Shahrezada of Kukushkino
 Best Actor: Eugene Rams for Shahrezada of Kukushkino

2013 
 Best Picture: The Princess Nasik Kyrgyzfilm named after T.Okeev, dir. Erkin Saliyev
 Best Director: Dir. Erkin Saliyev for The Princess Nasik film
 Best Screenplay: The Princess Nasik, Erkin Saliyev
 Best Cinematography: Hassan Kydyraliev The Princess Nasik
 Best Artist: Erkin Saliyev for  The Princess Nasik
 Best Sound: Ali Akhmadeev for  Mezgil jana Alykul (Time and Alykul)
 Best Editing: Eldiyar Madakim for Mezgil jana Alykul (Time and Alykul)
 Best Actress: Aidai Salieva for The Princess Nasik
 Best Actor: Chyngyz Mamaev for Mezgil jana Alykul (Time and Alykul)
 Best Producer: Omurzak Tolobek for The President and the Homeless
 Best Documentary: Zaryl ishin bolboso, Zardalyda emne bar  Kyrgyzs State Art Institute named after B.Beishenalieva, dir. Abdulalim Mamadaliev
 Best Short Fiction Film: Jymjyrt (Silence), Kyrgyzfilm named after T.Okeev, dir. Nargiza Mamatkulova
 Outstanding Contribution to Kyrgyz Cinema: Film Director Gennadiy Bazarov

2014 
 Best Picture: Salam, New York, dir. Ruslan Akun
 Best Director: Ruslan Akun for Salam, New York
 Best Screenplay: Sergey Krolevich Ruslan Akun, Gulzhan Toktogulova for Salam, New York
 Best Cinematography: Akzhol Bekbolotov for Korgum Kelet
 Best Artist: Ruslan tokoch, Maksat Bolotbekov for Salam, New York
 Best Composer: Erlan Arstan, Ishimbekova Kerimbayev for Salam, New York
 Best Sound: Bakit Niyazaliev, Amanbek Mairambek uulu for Passion
 Best Editing: Eldiyar Madakim for Salaam, New York
 Best Actress: Kalipa Usenova for Passion
 Best Actor: Artik Suyundukov for Passion
 Best Documentary: The country in which we live, dir. Elnura Osmonalieva
 Best Short Fiction Film: Peregon dir. Ruslan Akun
 The Audience Award is given to the producer of the highest box office film. This Award was given to the Producer of the film Salam, New York, Nurbek Aybashov.
 Prize "Outstanding Contribution to the Kyrgyz Cinema"  was awarded to Film Director Bolot Shamshiev

2015 
 Best Picture: Kurmanjan Datka, dir. prod. Sadyk Sher-Niyaz
 Best Director: Sadyk Sher-Niyaz for Kurmanjan Datka
 Best Screenplay: Sadyk Sher-Niyaz, Bakytbek Turdubaev for Kurmanjan Datka
 Best Cinematography: Murat Aliev for Kurmanjan Datka 
 Best Artist: Tolgobek Koychumanov for Aku
 Best Composer: Bakyt Alisherov, Murzali Zheenbaev for Kurmanjan Datka
 Best Sound: Bakit Niyazaliev for Kurmanjan Datka
 Best Editing: Eldiyar Madakim for Kurmanjan Datka
 Best Actress: Nazira Mambetova for Kurmanjan Datka
 Best Actor: Aziz Muradillaev for Kurmanjan Datka
 Best Documentary: Teacher, River and Gold, dir. Amanbek Ajymat
 Best Short Fiction Film: Topurak dir. Cholponay Borubaeva 
 The Audience Award is given to the producer of the highest box office film. This Award was given to the Producer of the film Kurmanjan Datka, Zhyldyzkan Zholdosheva.
 Best Picture of Central Asia: The Hosts, dir. Adilhan Erjanov (Kazakhstan)
 Prize "Outstanding Contribution to the Kyrgyz Cinema" was awarded to Artist Sagynbek Ishenov
 Prize "Outstanding Contribution to the World Cinema" was awarded to Film Director Ali Hamraev

2016 
 Best Picture: Heavenly Nomadic, prod. Sadyk Sher-Niyaz
 Best Director: Mirlan Abdykalykov for Heavenly Nomadic
 Best Screenplay: Ernest Abdyjaparov, Aktan Arym Kubat for Heavenly Nomadic
 Best Cinematography: Talantbek Akynbekov for Heavenly Nomadic
 Best Artist: Adis Seitaliev for Heavenly Nomadic
 Best Composer: Murzali Zheenbaev for Heavenly Nomadic
 Best Sound: Bakit Niyazaliev, Murat Ajiev for Heavenly Nomadic
 Best Editing: Eldiyar Madakim for Heavenly Nomadic
 Best Actress: Anara Nazarkulova for Heavenly Nomadic
 Best Actor: Tabyldy Aktanov for Heavenly Nomadic
 Best Documentary: Deti Chistoty, dir. Guzel Duyshonkulova
 Best Short Fiction Film: The Ring dir. Bakai Usenaliev 
 The Audience Award is given to the producer of the highest box office film. This Award was given to the Producer of the film Birtuuganchik, 1.1 Studio
 Best Picture of Central Asia: House for Mermaids, dir. Yelkin Tuychiev (Uzbekistan)
 Prize "Outstanding Contribution to the Kyrgyz Cinema" was awarded to Cinematographer Nurtay Borbiev
 Prize "Outstanding Contribution to the World Cinema" was awarded to Actress Natalya Arinbasarova

2017 
 Best Picture: A Father’s Will, prod. Gulmira Kerimova, Ermek Mukul
 Best Director: Bakyt Mukul, Dastan Zhapar uulu for A Father’s Will
 Best Screenplay: Dastan Zhapar uulu, Bakyt Mukul for A Father’s Will
 Best Cinematography: Akjol Bekbolotov for A Father’s Will
 Best Artist: Urmat Osmoev for A Father’s Will
 Best Composer: Murzali Zheenbaev for Munabia
 Best Sound: Kalybek Sherniyazov for Munabia 
 Best Editing: Aktan Ryskeldiev for A Father’s Will
 Best Actress: Meerim Atantaeva for Munabia
 Best Actor: Iman Mukul for A Father’s Will
 Best Documentary: My Dreams will come true in Next Spring, dir. Aman Ajymat 
 Best Short Fiction Film: Olgo dir. Bolsunbek Taalaybek uulu 
 The Audience Award is given to the producer of the highest box office film. This Award was given to the Producer of the film Plan B, MBPRO studio
 Best Picture of Central Asia: The Path to Mother, dir. Akan Sataev (Kazakhstan)
 Best Actress of Central Asia: Feruza Saidova for Podrobnosti Oseni (Uzbekistan)
 Best Actor of Central Asia: Bahodur Miralibekov for The Dream of the Ape (Tadjikistan)
 Prize "Outstanding Contribution to the Kyrgyz Cinema" was awarded to Writer Mar Baydjiev
 Prize "Outstanding Contribution to the World Cinema" was awarded to Film Director Hodjakuli Narliev

2018 
 Best Picture: Centaur, prod. Oy Art Film Producing Company, Kyrgyzfilm
 Best Director: Aktan Arym Kubat for Centaur
 Best Screenplay: Aktan Arym Kubat, Ernest Abdyjaparov for Centaur
 Best Actress: Taalaikan Abazova for Centaur
Best Actor: Azamat Ulanov for Finding Mother
Best Editing: Eldiyar Madakim for Finding Mother
The Audience Award is given for the highest box office film. This Award was received by Ruslan Akun, the Director of the film Finding Mother

References

External links 

 Special prize of "Ak Ilbirs"
 Mar Baidzhiev will be awarded with the statuette "Ak Ilbirs"
 Bakhodir Miralibekov - best actor in Central Asia
 The best actor of Central Asia
 Feruza Saidova became the best actress in Central Asia
 The main prize of the "Ak Ilbirs"
 National Film Award "Ak Ilbirs" -2017 will select 18 winners
 Ak Ilbirs Ceremony
 "A Father's Will" - winner of "Ak Ilbirs-2017"
 The laureates of the National Film Award "Ak Ilbirs" (list)
 Kazakh film won the Kyrgyz film award "Ak Ilbirs"
 The film "A Father's Will" won seven awards in "Ak Illbirs-2017"
 Ak Ilbirs 2017 
 Bahodur Miralibekov is recognized as the best actor of Central Asia 
 Khodzhakuli Narliev received Kyrgyz national film award
 My character is similar to Maleny from the same Italian film - M.Atantaeva about her role in the movie "Munabiya"
 The film "The Path to Mother" is recognized as the best in Central Asia
 Kyrgyz cinematography
 List of the kyrgyz films shoot at 2013
 Perspective competition
 Ak Ilbirs page in YouTube
 First Ak Ilbirs ceremony
 Ak Ilbirs news
 Ak Ilbirs news Limon kg
 Ak Ilbirs winners 2014
 I Ak Ilbirs film list
 I Ak Ilbirs winners
 Gallery
 Ceremony 2014 
 Ak Ilbirs 2013
 Nominates 2014
 Ak Ilbirs Kyrgyz Oscar
 ceremony results 2014
 Nominates 2012
 began accepting applications 2013
 short list 2014
 best film 2014
 Ak Ilbirs 2014
 Deadline 2013
 Establishment of Ak Ilbirs
 New kyrgyz film award
 Nominates 2014
 Best of the bests 2014
 short list 2014
 Ak Ilbirs ceremony 2014
 Winner in Perspective competition
 Ak Ilbirs will become an annual cultural event
 2015 declared the Year of Snow Leopard
 Regulations 2012
 List of nominates 2014
 Ak Ilbirs news
 Ak Ilbirs 2012
 Long list 2012
 Ak Ilbirs news 2013
 Statuete
 National award time

2012 establishments in Kyrgyzstan
Awards established in 2012
Asian film awards